The Villa Margherita is an Italian Renaissance house at 4 South Battery, Charleston, South Carolina. It was built in 1892 and early 1893 for Andrew Simonds. The house is of brick with a Portland cement coating according to the plans by the architect, Frederick P. Dinkelberg. The decorative work on the four Corinthian columns and frieze on the front was executed by Morrison Brothers of New York City. The entrance of the house features a large atrium with a fountain.

Between 1905 and 1953, the house served as a hotel. During that use, guests included William Howard Taft, Grover Cleveland, and Theodore Roosevelt. Sinclair Lewis was a guest at the hotel, where he completed the manuscript for Main Street. In 1935, author Gertrude Stein and her partner Alice B. Toklas spent Valentine's Day at the Villa Margherita during Stein's American tour. From 1943 to 1946, the United Seaman's Service leased the hotel and rented rooms to seamen and their families. In 1961, James and Mary Wilson bought the house. Their daughter, Mary Wilson, sold it for $3 million to Stephen and Mary Hammond in September 2012.

References

Houses in Charleston, South Carolina
Houses completed in 1893